Adam Saad (born 23 July 1994) is an Australian rules footballer currently playing for the Carlton Football Club in the Australian Football League. He previously played for the Gold Coast Suns and the Essendon Football Club.

Early career

As a junior, Saad first played for West Coburg Football Club in the Essendon District Football League. Saad joined Coburg in 2013 following a TAC Cup stint with the Calder Cannons. After appearing to struggle between Senior and Development level football, he established himself as one of the VFL's leading small defenders, winning the Coburg best and fairest award in 2014 sharing in a tie with Daniel Venditti, and was named in the 2014 VFL Team of the Year. His strong form and State Combine testing led him to being drafted to the Gold Coast Suns with pick 25 in the 2015 rookie draft.

AFL career

In round 5, 2015, Saad was nominated for the Rising Star after his team's win over the Brisbane Lions where he had 26 touches.

Following the 2017 season, Saad requested and was granted a trade to Essendon, who sent their 2018 second round draft pick to the Gold Coast in return. At Essendon, Saad showed his durability by only missing one game in three seasons. He slotted into the backline, used his pace to full effort, and was inventive in moving the ball forward. Saad claimed third place in the club's Crichton Medal count in 2019.

Saad requested a trade to  after the 2020 season, and he was traded on 11 November. Saad kicked his first goal for Carlton in the Blues' round 7, 2021 win against his old side Essendon.

Through his career, Saad has been known for his dashing pace, and propensity to run long distances with the ball, frequently bouncing it. He led the league in bounces in 2017, 2018, 2021 and 2022; in both 2018 and 2022, his tally of bounces more than doubled his nearest rival. He has a long left-foot kick, and during his time at Carlton, the spectators would shout "woof!" whenever he took a kick; he was the fifth long-kicking left footed Carlton player to receive this traditional treatment, which had originated with Val Perovic in the 1980s.

Personal life
Saad is a practicing Muslim. He is of Lebanese descent.

Statistics
Updated to the end of 2022.

|- 
| 2015
|  || 42 || 16 || 1 || 2 || 121 || 151 || 272 || 66 || 44 || 0.1 || 0.1 || 7.6 || 9.4 || 17.0 || 4.1 || 2.8 || 3
|-
| 2016
|  || 42 || 10 || 0 || 2 || 75 || 76 || 151 || 36 || 25 || 0.0 || 0.2 || 7.5 || 7.6 || 15.1 || 3.6 || 2.5 || 0
|-
| 2017
|  || 42 || 22 || 2 || 7 || 194 || 171 || 365 || 78 || 50 || 0.1 || 0.3 || 8.8 || 7.8 || 16.6 || 3.5 || 2.3 || 1
|-
| 2018
|  || 42 || 22 || 0 || 3 || 199 || 178 || 377 || 56 || 55 || 0.0 || 0.1 || 9.0 || 8.1 || 17.1 || 2.5 || 2.5 || 3
|- 
| 2019
|  || 42 || 22 || 3 || 0 || 239 || 149 || 388 || 62 || 75 || 0.1 || 0.0 || 10.9 || 6.8 || 17.6 || 2.8 || 3.4 || 0
|-
| 2020 ||  || 42 || 17 || 2 || 1 || 202 || 119 || 321 || 49 || 34 || 0.1 || 0.1 || 11.9 || 7.0 || 18.9 || 2.9 || 2.0 || 2
|- 
| 2021
|  || 42 || 22 || 2 || 6 || 311 || 113 || 424 || 72 || 39 || 0.1 || 0.3 || 14.1 || 5.1 || 19.3 || 3.3 || 1.8 || 0
|-
| 2022
|style="text-align:center;"|
| 42 || 21 || 0 || 0 || 323 || 136 || 459 || 100 || 47 || 0.0 || 0.0 || 15.4 || 6.5 || 22 || 4.8 || 2.2 || 3
|- class="sortbottom"
! colspan=3| Career
! 152
! 10
! 21
! 1664
! 1093
! 2757
! 519
! 369
! 0.1
! 0.1
! 10.9
! 7.2
! 18.1
! 3.4
! 2.4
! 12
|}

Notes

References

External links

Living people
1994 births
Australian rules footballers from Melbourne
Essendon Football Club players
Gold Coast Football Club players
Coburg Football Club players
Australian Muslims
Australian people of Lebanese descent
Carlton Football Club players
People from Brunswick, Victoria